Henry Forster (born c. 1883) was an English footballer who played for Sunderland as a defender. He made his debut for Sunderland against Sheffield United on 9 February 1907 in a 3–2 defeat at Bramall Lane. In total, Forster made 103 appearances for Sunderland without scoring.

References
Henry Forster's careers stats at The Stat Cat

1880s births
English footballers
Sunderland A.F.C. players
Year of death missing
Association football defenders